Gurparan (also Romanized as Gūrparān; also known as Kūrparān) is a village in Rahal Rural District, in the Central District of Khoy County, West Azerbaijan Province, Iran. At the 2006 census, its population was 400, in 81 families.

References 

Populated places in Khoy County